Al Despertar may refer to:

 Al Despertar (Enrique Iglesias song)
 Al Despertar (Mercedes Sosa song)
 Al Despertar (album), a 1998 album by Mercedes Sosa